FK Guliston is an Uzbekistani football club based in Guliston, Sirdaryo Region.

History
FK Guliston played 4 seasons in the Uzbek League: 1993, 1994, 2000, 2003. In 1992 the club won the First Division and were promoted to the Uzbek League. The club played until 1994 under the name of Shifokor Guliston. In 2001 FK Guliston and FK Yangiyer merged into FK Sirdaryo representing the Sirdaryo region. Since 2009 the club has played under the name of FK Guliston again with FK Yangiyer representing a separate team as well.

At the end of season 2011 FK Guliston were promoted to top league. The club could not enter the 2012 Uzbek League and was replaced by Qizilqum Zarafshon because of financial problems. On 19 December 2011 Alexander Mochinov was appointed as new head coach of the club.

At the end of the 2012 First League season FK Guliston gained promotion to Uzbek Oliy League again, after securing second place in their division. In 2013 Uzbek League FK Guliston began with good start, but finished season in 13th position and relegated to First League. The club manager Bakhtiyor Ashurmatov left the club in December 2013.

Name change history
 until 1994: Shifokor Guliston
 1994—2001: FK Guliston
 2001—2008: FK Sirdaryo
 2009— : FK Guliston

League history

Honours
 Uzbekistan First League champion: 2
 1992, 2002
 Uzbekistan First League runner-up: 2
 2011, 2012

Managerial history

References

External links
 FK Guliston official page
 FK Guliston matches and results

Football clubs in Uzbekistan
Sirdaryo Region